Manichaeans

Alp Qutluq Külüg Bilge Qaghan — seventh khagan of the Uyghur Khaganate and the first one from the Ädiz clan. His Tang invested title was Huaixin Qaghan.

Life 
He was born in the Ädiz clan, was orphaned early in childhood and adopted by the Yaglakar clan. He quickly rose in the ranks thanks to his strategic thinking and rhetorical skill. He was appointed Grand Chancellor (İl Ögesi in Old Uyghur) with the title Inanchu Bilge around 782. He was the who met Chinese embassy bringing Tun Baga Tarkhan's uncle's body back. He was also present as the head of delegation to Chang'an in marriage ceremony for qaghan and Princess Xian'an (咸安公主) in 788. He commanded the Uyghur army against Tibetans who were aided by Karluk Yabgu State ruler Alp Burguchan who united Chigils, Bulaqs and Shatuo, near Beshbaliq in 790. As the result Yang Xigu (楊襲古) Commander of Beiting Protectorate committed suicide. Although Chinese sources states that it was Inanchu who killed him in November 791. He was appointed as regent of Qutluq Bilge Qaghan since he was a minor in 790.

Reign 
After Qutluq Bilge's untimely death he succeeded to the qaghanate upon election of nobles. He didn't change his surname to original one but kept Yaglakar name, nevertheless he exiled all of remaining princes from cadet branches to Chang'an. One of his first deeds was to adopt Manichaeism as the state religion again in 803, after a visit to Manichean temple in Qocho. According to Colin Mackerras and Takao Moriyasu, he did not have any relations with China until 805 and this led Chinese historians to believe that khagan died in 805. This was further proven by surprise at Chinese court when they witnessed Manicheans among the embassy in 806. Qaghan requested the Manichean temples to be reopened in China.

His reign saw territorial expansion of the khaganate, subjugation of Yenisei Kyrgyz, defeat of Karluk Yabgu State and Tibetan Empire in Tarim Basin, conquest of Beshbaliq in 790, Karashar and Kucha in 798. New western border was the river Syr-Darya. He also possibly aided Rafi ibn al-Layth against Abbasids.

Death 
He died sometime after March 808 and was followed by Baoyi Qaghan.

References 

8th-century births
808 deaths
Ädiz clan
8th-century monarchs in Asia
9th-century monarchs in Asia
8th-century Turkic people
9th-century Turkic people
Founding monarchs